Clinopodium nepeta (synonym Calamintha nepeta), known as lesser calamint, is a perennial herb of the mint family.

Description

Lesser calamint is a perennial shrub, forming a compact mound of shiny, green oregano-like leaves. The flowers are lavender pink. The plant reaches a  height of 18 inches. The lesser calamint smells like a cross between mint and oregano. It attracts honeybees and butterflies. Lesser calamint usually grows in the summer, and well into the fall. It can become dormant in the winter months, then reblossom in spring. In fall, the flowers fall to the ground and will self-seed. Seedlings will flower in late August. Lesser calamint often grows wild, but can also be kept in pots. The average life expectancy of a plant is 3–4 years. It is susceptible to powdery mildew.

Taxonomy
The species was first described by Carl Linnaeus in 1753 as Melissa nepeta. It was subsequently placed in Calamintha, Thymus, Satureja and Clinopodium, among other genera. The last of these is currently accepted by the World Checklist of Selected Plant Families.

Subspecies
Three subspecies are recognized:
 Clinopodium nepeta subsp. nepeta – south central and southern Europe to northern Iran
 Clinopodium nepeta subsp. spruneri – Mediterranean to the Caucasus
 Clinopodium nepeta subsp. subisodontum – east central and south east Europe

Uses
Lesser calamint is commonly used as an herb in the Cuisine of Corsica and Italian cuisine, where it is called nepita, mentuccia, nipitella or nepitella. In southern Italy, it is used in the making of a goat cheese called cassiedu, giving the cheese a minty taste.

Some sources state that Nepeta nepetella, not lesser calamint, is the nepitella used in cooking.

It's used to aromatize boiled chestnuts along with other herbs in Galicia, Northwest Spain.

References

Herbs
nepeta
Plants described in 1753
Taxa named by Carl Linnaeus